Sigurdur Helgason may refer to:

 Sigurdur Helgason (airline executive) (1921–2009), innovator in low-cost airlines
 Sigurður Helgason (mathematician) (born 1927), Icelandic mathematician
 Sigurður Helgason (basketball) (born 1940), Icelandic basketball player and coach